The 2010–11 UC Irvine Anteaters men's basketball team represented the University of California, Irvine during the 2010–11 NCAA Division I men's basketball season. The Anteaters, led by first year head coach Russell Turner, played their home games at the Bren Events Center and were members of the Big West Conference. They finished the season 13–19, 6–10 in Big West play to finish tied for seventh place.

Previous season 
The 2009–10 UC Irvine Anteaters men's basketball team finished the season with a record of 14–18, and 6–10 in PCAA play. Following the big west tournament, it was announced that head coach Pat Douglass would not have his contract renewed. Golden State Warriors assistant coach Russell Turner was announced as the new head coach on April 9, 2010.

Off-Season

2010 Recruiting Class

Roster

Schedule

|-
!colspan=9 style=|Regular Season

|-
!colspan=9 style=| Big West tournament

Source

Awards and honors
Darren Moore
Big West Second Team All-Conference

Source:

References

UC Irvine
UC Irvine Anteaters men's basketball seasons
UC Irvine Anteaters
UC Irvine Anteaters